Miscampbell is a surname. Notable people with the surname include: 

Andrew Miscampbell (1848–1905), Canadian politician
Norman Miscampbell (1925–2007), British politician

Surnames of British Isles origin